Vishal Amugoda (born 20 June 1996) is a Sri Lankan cricketer. He made his first-class debut for Kalutara Town Club in Tier B of the 2018–19 Premier League Tournament on 1 April 2019.

References

External links
 

1996 births
Living people
Sri Lankan cricketers
Kalutara Town Club cricketers